Shahjoy District is a district of Zabul province in southern Afghanistan. It is located in the eastern part of the province, next to Ghazni province.

Demographics 
It has a population of about 56,800 as of 2013. The district is mostly populated by the Hotak tribe of Ghilji Pashtuns.

See also 
 Districts of Afghanistan

References

External links 

Districts of Zabul Province